John R. Palmer (June 27, 1809May 1, 1877) was a Michigan politician.

Early life
Palmer was born on June 27, 1809 in New York. In 1844, Palmer moved to Michigan.

Career
Palmer was a farmer. On November 2, 1852, Palmer was elected to the Michigan House of Representatives where he represented the Calhoun County 1st district from January 5, 1853 to December 31, 1854.

Death
Palmer died on May 1, 1877.

References

1809 births
1877 deaths
People from New York (state)
People from Calhoun County, Michigan
Democratic Party members of the Michigan House of Representatives
19th-century American politicians